Teyon Ware (born August 13, 1983) is an American amateur wrestler. Competing for the Oklahoma Sooners, Ware won NCAA Division I wrestling titles at 141 pounds in 2003 and 2005.  Ware is a 4-time All-American, former Big 12 Conference champion, and U.S. world team member that competed at the 2011 World Wrestling Championships. Ware married Shea Nicole McMullin on July 26, 2014. On July 15, 2015, it was announced that Ware would join the University of Wyoming's coaching staff.

Elementary school
Attended Windsor Hills Baptist School in Oklahoma City, Oklahoma.

High school years 
Teyon attended Edmond North High School in Edmond, Oklahoma. In high school, Ware was a letterman in football and wrestling. In wrestling, he won 4 Oklahoma State titles and compiled a perfect 132-0 record. In football, he won All-District honors and second team All-State honors. Teyon was Homecoming King his senior year.

College 
Teyon attended the University of Oklahoma on a full ride wrestling scholarship. He won Nationals his freshmen year, took 6th place his sophomore year, won his junior year and placed second his senior year. He graduated in May 2007 with a Mass Communications degree.

2011 World Championships 
Ware competed at the 2011 World Wrestling Championships in freestyle at 66 kg where he lost to Andriy Stadnik 2-1, 4-0.

References 

1983 births
Living people
Sportspeople from Oklahoma City
Wrestlers at the 2011 Pan American Games
American male sport wrestlers
Pan American Games bronze medalists for the United States
Pan American Games medalists in wrestling
Medalists at the 2011 Pan American Games
20th-century American people
21st-century American people